Glamorest Life is the third studio album by American rapper Trina. It was released by Slip-N-Slide Records and Atlantic on October 4, 2005.
Her final album with Atlantic, in 2007, Trina signed to EMI in conjunction with her original label, Slip-n-Slide .

Singles 
It spawned three singles: 
The lead single "Don't Trip", featuring Lil Wayne, the single wasn't largely successful, however, as it only reached number seventy-four on the Hot R&B/Hip-Hop Songs chart.

The second single from the album, "Here We Go", featuring Kelly Rowland, was released in September 2005. The single reached seventeen on the Hot 100, number eight on the Hot R&B/Hip-Hop Songs chart and number three on the Hot Rap Songs chart. The single also reached the Top 20 in most countries worldwide, becoming Trina's first highly successful single. The single went Gold in 2006 for selling over 500,000 copies. The song has been listed for 33 weeks in 4 different charts. Its first appearance was week 40/2005 in the US Singles Top 100 and the last appearance was week 22/2006 in the UK Singles Top 75. Its peak position was number 15, on the UK Singles Top 75, it stayed there for 1 week. Its highest entry was number 17 in the Finland Singles Top 20 and New Zealand Top 40.

The third and final single "Da Club", featuring Mannie Fresh, was released on November 22, 2005.

Critical reception

AllMusic editor Andy Kellman found that "Trina's righteous raunchiness is more than a little exhausted on Glamorest Life, the Miami MC's third album. She seems to know it too, sounding distanced and not nearly as energized as she was on 2002's Diamond Princess. That puts more weight on the productions and guest verses."

Commercial performance 
The album debuted at number eleven on the US Billboard 200, number two on the Top R&B/Hip-Hop Albums chart and number two on the Top Rap Albums chart, selling 77,000 units in its first week. To date the album sold 398,000 copies.

Track listing 

Notes
 denotes co-producer

Personnel 
Credits for Glamorest Life adapted from Allmusic.

Aaron Bay-Schuck: Artist Coordination
Musa "Milk" Adeoye: A&R
Robert Alexander: Art Direction
Alexander Allen: Stylist
Veronica Alvericci: Marketing Consultant
D.K. Baker: Composer
Bigg D: Piano, Producer
Jullian Andres Boothe: Marketing Consultant
Leslie Brathwaite: Mixing
Robert "Big Briz" Brisbane: Engineer
Josh "Redd" Burke: A&R
Mike Caren A&R,: Producer
D.P. "Dad" Carter: Composer
Krishna Das: Mixing
Anne Declemente: A&R
Dré: Performer
Damon Eden: A&R
Mannie Fresh: Producer
Nick Fury: Producer
Brian Gardner: Mastering
Bernie Grundman: Mastering
Solomon "Sox" Hepburn: Executive Producer
Kram Iksirbo: Art Direction, Design
Jazze Pha: Producer
Signature: Producer
Dave Junco: Engineer
KLC: Producer
Christian Lantry: Photography
Alan Lewis: Art Direction
N. "Fury" Loftin: Composer
Ted Lucas: Executive Producer
P. Magnet: Vocals
Fabian Marasciullo: Mixing
Alexander Martin: Art Direction
Money Mark Diggla: Producer
Teedra Moses: Composer
Rick Ross: Composer
James Scheffer: Composer
Ray Seay: Mixing
Katrina "Trina" Taylor: Executive Producer
Byron Trice: Art Direction
N. Washington: Composer
Fernando Watson: Marketing Consultant
Andrew Zaeh: Photo Production

Charts

Weekly charts

Year-end charts

References 

2005 albums
Trina albums
Albums produced by Mannie Fresh
Albums produced by Cool & Dre
Albums produced by Jazze Pha
Albums produced by Jim Jonsin
Atlantic Records albums